Active was launched at Bermuda in 1789. She transferred to Liverpool circa 1798 and then spent a few years as a West Indiaman. Between 1802 and 1803 she made one voyage as a slave ship in the triangular trade in enslaved persons. She was captured off West Africa around late 1804 on her second voyage before she could start acquiring slaves.

Career
Active first appeared in Lloyd's Register (LR) in 1798,

Slave ship
1st slave voyage (1802–1803):: Captain Isaac Nomus sailed from Liverpool on 4 August 1802. Active arrived at Demerara on 19 December 1802. She sailed from Demerara on 17 March 1803 and arrived back at Liverpool on 12 May. She had left with 22 crew members and she suffered one crew death during the voyage. At some point on the voyage, Captain Robert Hall replaced Nomus.
 

2nd slave voyage (1803–loss): Captain James Dalrymple acquired a letter of marque on 2 September 1803. Captain John Dalrymple sailed from Liverpool on 26 October.

Fate

Citations

1789 ships
Ships built in Bermuda
Age of Sail merchant ships of England
Liverpool slave ships
Captured ships